This is a list of newspapers published in Metro Manila. Metro Manila has four major English-language daily papers: the Manila Bulletin, The Manila Times, the Philippine Daily Inquirer, and The Philippine Star.

Broadsheets
 BusinessMirror
 BusinessWorld
 Chinese Commercial News
 The Daily Tribune
 Global Daily Mirror
 Malaya
 Manila Bulletin
 Manila Shimbun
 The Manila Times
 The Market Monitor
 The Philippine Chronicle
 Philippine Daily Inquirer
 The Philippine Star
 The Standard
 United Daily News

Online
ABS-CBN News
Bulgar Online
e-Dyario
GMA News
News5
 Kicker Daily News
 Manila Seoul
 Rappler
 Sun.Star Manila
 World News PH

Tabloids
 Abante
 Abante Tonite
 Agila ng Bayan
 Bagong Sagad Ngayon
 Bagong Sagad sa Balita at Impormasyon Ngayon
 Bagong Tiktik
 Bagong Toro
 Balita
 Bandera
 Bomba Balita
 Bulgar
 Diyaryo Pinoy (Free Paper)
 Hataw
 Inquirer Libre
 Kadyot Bawat Report May Sundot
 Llamado
 Metro Daily 
 Metro Manila Today
 Pang-Masa
 People's Journal
 People's Monitor
 People's Tonight
 Pilipino Mirror
 Pilipino Star Ngayon
 Pinas
 Largabistang Pinoy
 Pinoy Parazzi
 Pinoy Weekly
Police Files Tonite
 Ratsada
 Remate
 Saksi sa Balita
 Sikat
 Taliba
 Tanod
 Tempo
 The Business Express
 The Daily Sun
 The Philippines Observer: Kontra
 Tumbok

Magazines
 Astro Horoscope Feng Shui 
 Astro Horoscope Lucky Charms 
 Ating Alamin Gazette
 Bannawag
 Bisaya
 Eksena 
 Famous Spot Magazine
 Hiligaynon
 The Jeepney Magazine
 Liwayway
 Magnegosyo Tayo 
 Moviestar Magasin
 The Philippine Panorama
 Rising Star Feng Shui 
 Rising Star Horoscope 
 Rising Star Chinese Horoscope 
 Rising Star Horoscope Prediction 
 Starweek
 Sunday Inquirer Magazine
 WU! Manila Magazine

Defunct periodicals

Newspapers
 Ang Kaibigan ng Bayan
 Daily Globe
 Diario de Manila
 El Debate
 La Ilustración Filipina
 La Vanguardia
 Mabuhay
 Manila Chronicle
 Philippines Daily Express 
 Philippine Herald
 Times Journal
 Today

Tabloids
 Banat 
 Bosero 
 Pinoy Times
 Remate Tonight 
 RP Daily Exposé 
 Toro
 TIK-TIK

See also
 List of newspapers in the Philippines

References

External links
 Newspapers and Magazines in Metro Manila

 
Newspapers
Newspapers